Candida is a 2006 Spanish comedy film by Javier Fesser with Candida Villar, Jorge Bosch and Raul Pena. The film was nominated in the category Best Original Song at the 22nd Goya Awards for "La vida secreta de las pequeñas cosas" by David Broza and Jorge Drexler.

References

2006 films
2006 comedy films
Spanish comedy films
2000s Spanish-language films
2000s Spanish films